The Ministry of Finance, Economic Affairs and Investment is a government ministry of Barbados responsible for the management of public finances. Historically, Prime Minister of Barbados has mostly held the additional portfolio of Minister of Finance.

Ministers of Finance

See also
Government of Barbados
Central Bank of Barbados
Economy of Barbados

References

Government ministries of Barbados
Economy of Barbados
Barbados
Barbados
1954 establishments in Barbados